Francesc de Tamarit i de Rifà (1584 – 1653) was a Catalan Marshal and the military deputy of the Principality of Catalonia (1639–1641) voted by the Catalan aristocracy, notable for his service in the Reapers' War, particularly at the Battle of Montjuïc in 1641 where the force of the Catalan army defeated a much larger Spanish army. 

He was born in Barcelona, Spain. The son of Pere de Tamarit, he was member of the Consell de Cent.

References

Bibliography

1584 births
1653 deaths
Politicians from Catalonia
History of Barcelona
People of the Reapers' War
Principality of Catalonia